John Freemantle (1758, probably at Bishop Sutton, Hampshire – 3 August 1831 at Alresford, Hampshire) was an English cricketer who played for the legendary Hambledon Club.

John Freemantle was the elder brother of the more famous Andrew Freemantle.  He had only a short first-class career from the 1780 season until 1782, playing seven times for Hampshire.

Freemantle was primarily a bowler and in Scores & Biographies, it is said that he was "tolerably fast".  He was a useful batsman but it is said that when fielding he "never flinched from the ball".

References

Further reading
 Arthur Haygarth, Scores & Biographies, Volume 1 (1744-1826), Lillywhite, 1862
 Ashley Mote, The Glory Days of Cricket, Robson, 1997

English cricketers
Hampshire cricketers
English cricketers of 1701 to 1786
1758 births
1831 deaths
Hambledon cricketers